Medical cybernetics is a branch of cybernetics which has been heavily affected by the development of the computer, which applies the concepts of cybernetics to medical research and practice. At the intersection of systems biology, systems medicine and clinical applications it covers an emerging working program for the application of systems- and communication theory, connectionism and decision theory on biomedical research and health related questions.

Overview 
Medical cybernetics searches for quantitative descriptions of biological dynamics. It investigates intercausal networks in human biology, medical decision making and information processing structures in the living organism.

Approaches of medical cybernetics include:
 Systems theory in medical sciences: The scope of  systems theory in the medical sciences is searching for and modelling of physiological dynamics in the intact and diseased organism to gain deeper insights into the organizational principles of life and its perturbations. With focus on medical application this field is also referred to as systems medicine.
 Medical information and communication theory: Motivated by the awareness of information being an essential principle of life, the application of communication theory to biomedicine aims at an mathematical description of signalling processes and information storage in different physiological layers. This attempt also includes theories on the information theory of the genetic code.
 Connectionism: Connectionistic models describe information processing in neural networks – thus forming a bridge between biological and technological research.
 Medical decision theory (MDT): The Goal of MDT is to gather evidence based foundations for decision making in the clinical setting.

See also 

Related fields
 Biocybernetics
 Complex systems
 Cybernetics
 Systems theory
 Prosthetics
 Systems biology
 Systems medicine

Related scientists
 Uri Alon
 William Ross Ashby
 Claude Bernard
 Valentin Braitenberg
 Walter Cannon
 Stephen Grossberg
 Humberto Maturana
 Warren McCulloch

Related scientists
 Walter Pitts
 Arturo Rosenblueth
 Robert Trappl
 Felix Tretter
 Francisco Varela
 Frederic Vester
 Kevin Warwick
 Paul Watzlawick

 List of biomedical cybernetics software
 List of medical cybernetics schools, Colleges and Universities
Medical Cybernetics College Bradford, UK with Support office in Lenasia, Johannesburg, RSA. Principal Mohammed Dockrat, Medical Cyberneticist

References

Further reading 
 V.V. Parin (1959), "Introduction to medical Cybernetics" in NASA Technical Translation no.F-459-F-462, National Aeronautics and Space Administration, 1959.
 C.A. Muses (1965). "Aspects of some crucial problems in biological and medical cybernetics". In: Progress in biocybernetics, 1965.

External links 
 Institute for Medical Cybernetics and Artificial Intelligence, Medical University Vienna, Austria
 Medical Cybernetics in the Open Encyclopedia Project
 Portal Server Medizinische Kybernetik | Medical Cybernetics
 UCLA Biocybernetics Laboratory, Los Angeles, Ca, USA

Biomedical cybernetics